Rao Bahadur Cruz Fernandez was born on 15 November 1869. He was the longest serving chairman of Thoothukudi (Tuticorin) Municipality and is considered the father and architect of Modern Tuticorin.He is from Paravar caste He had one child Named Joseph Innocent Fernandez. And his eldest grandson was Regis Cruz Fernandez. who was working as A Headmaster in a village school from 1987. Regis Had Three children Named Bennita Angile Fernandez, Regitta Filhppena Fernandez And Joseph Innocent Fernandez.  He was elected to the chairmanship of Tuticorin municipality five times between 1909 and 1927. He was awarded the title of RAO BAHADUR by the Government and was elected to the Madras Legislative Assembly. The Municipality building (Rao Bahadur Cruz Fernandez Building) is named after him. His statues are installed in front of the Municipal Building and also in the midst of the Town Tuticorin.

Drinking Water Scheme

In 1873 an open channel of 6.4 km length was excavated by the Public Works Department at cost of Rs. 4,000/- for diverting the water of the Korampallam irrigation tank to a reservoir in the outskirts of the town. From this reservoir water was distributed to several wells in the town by means of conduits and earthenware pipes laid by the Municipal council at a cost of Rs. 9380/- in 1896 a comprehensive water supply scheme was recommended by the Sanitary Board. It consisted of two portions and the execution of the first portion took place in 1906 at a cost of Rs. 1,17,780/- and the second in April 1908. Later, it was found that the improvement of the Korampallam tank interfered with the irrigation interests of the ryots. But due to contamination in the drinking water, cholera and other water borne diseases occurred frequently and affected hundreds of people. In order to control these epidemic diseases, Cruz Fernandez who was the Chairman of the Municipality during 1909, 1910, 1912, 1919 and 1925 introduced a novel scheme. it was a joint water supply scheme for the three towns namely Tuticorin, Tirunelveli and Palayamkottai from the Thamirabarani River near Vallanadu which is 38 km from Tuticorin at a cost of Rs. 18,23,275/- in 1932. Both these Municipalities and the public works departments plunged in action during 1914 to 1915. but the break of World War I affected its further progress and the work was kept in abeyance. In 1925 and 1926 the expenses of the project was escalated to Rs. 27,83,765/-. Cruz Fernandez got this amount as grant and as loan and completed the scheme in 1938 and enabled the people of Tuticorin, to get good drinking water. Before the completion of this scheme when there was scarcity of water, Cruz Fernandez arranged bringing of water to this town by train from Kadambur and by Thonis (Country Boats) from Sri Lanka. Water tax was also levied on the people. Though initially it was criticized by the people, the success of the programme changed their mind to accept it without opposition.

References 

Indian National Congress politicians from Tamil Nadu
Rai Bahadurs
1869 births
Year of death missing
People from Thoothukudi